The second of two 1948 Buenos Aires Grand Prix (official name: II Gran Premio de Eva Duarte Perón (Gran Premio Dalmiro Varela Castex), was a Grand Prix motor race held at the Palermo street circuit in Buenos Aires on February 14, 1948.

Classification

References

Buenos Aires Grand Prix (II)
Buenos Aires Grand Prix (II)
Buenos Aires Grand Prix